A Cadbury Creme Egg is a chocolate confection produced in the shape of an egg, originating from the British chocolatier Fry's in 1963 before being renamed by Cadbury in 1971. The product consists of a thick chocolate shell containing an enzymatically-derived sweet white and yellow filling that resembles fondant. The filling mimics the albumen and yolk of a soft boiled egg from a fowl such as a chicken or goose.

The Creme Egg is the best-selling confectionery item between New Year's Day and Easter in the UK, with annual sales in excess of 200 million eggs and a brand value of approximately £55 million. However, in 2016 sales plummeted after the controversial decision to change the recipe from the original Cadbury Dairy Milk chocolate to a cheaper substitute, with reports of a loss of more than £6M in sales.

Creme Eggs are produced by Cadbury in the United Kingdom, by The Hershey Company in the United States, and by Cadbury Adams in Canada. They are sold by Mondelez International in all markets except the US, where The Hershey Company has the local marketing rights. At the Bournville factory in Birmingham in the UK, they are manufactured at a rate of 1.5 million per day. The Creme Egg was also previously manufactured in New Zealand, but has been imported from the UK since 2009. A YouGov poll saw the Creme Egg ranked as the most famous confectionery in the UK.

While filled eggs were first manufactured by the Cadbury Brothers in 1923, the Creme Egg in its current form was introduced in 1963. Initially sold as Fry's Creme Eggs (incorporating the Fry's brand), they were renamed "Cadbury's Creme Eggs" in 1971.

Composition

Cadbury Creme Eggs are manufactured as two chocolate half shells, each of which is filled with a white fondant made from sugar, glucose syrup, inverted sugar syrup, dried egg white and flavouring. The fondant in each half is topped with a smaller amount of the same mixture coloured yellow with paprika extract, to mimic the yolk and white of a real egg. Both halves are then quickly joined together and cooled, the shell bonding together in the process. The solid eggs are removed from the moulds and wrapped in foil.

During an interview in a 2007 episode of Late Night with Conan O'Brien, actor B. J. Novak drew attention to the fact that American market Cadbury Creme Eggs had decreased in size, despite the official Cadbury website stating otherwise. Before 2006, the eggs marketed by Hershey were identical to the UK version, weighing  and containing 170 kcal. The foil wrapper from a 2021 egg bought in the UK states  but does not mention calorific content.

In 2015, the British Cadbury company under the American Mondelēz International conglomerate announced that it had changed the formula of the Cadbury Creme Egg by replacing its Cadbury Dairy Milk chocolate with "standard cocoa mix chocolate". It had also reduced the packaging from 6 eggs to 5 with a less than proportionate decrease in price. This resulted in a large number of complaints from consumers. Analysts at IRI found that Cadbury lost more than $12 million in Creme Egg sales in the UK.

Sale
Creme Eggs are available individually and in boxes, with the numbers of eggs per package varying per country. The foil wrapping of the eggs was traditionally pink, blue, purple, and yellow in the United Kingdom and Ireland, though green was removed and purple replaced blue early in the 21st century. In the United States, some green is incorporated into the design, which previously featured the product's mascot, the Creme Egg Chick.

Creme Eggs are available annually between 1 January and Easter Sunday. In the UK in the 1980s, Cadbury made Creme Eggs available year-round but sales dropped and they returned to seasonal availability. In 2018, white chocolate versions of the Creme Eggs were made available. These eggs were not given a wrapper that clearly marked them as white chocolate eggs, and were mixed in with the normal Creme Eggs in the United Kingdom. Individuals who discovered an egg would win money via a ticket that had a code printed on it inside of the wrapper.

Creme Eggs were manufactured in New Zealand at the Cadbury factory in Dunedin from 1983 to 2009. Cadbury in New Zealand and Australia went through a restructuring process, with most Cadbury products previously produced in New Zealand being manufactured instead at Cadbury factories in Australia. The Dunedin plant later received a $69 million upgrade to specialise in boxed products such as Cadbury Roses, and Creme Eggs were no longer produced there. The result of the changes meant that Creme Eggs were instead imported from the United Kingdom. The change also saw the range of Creme Eggs available for sale decrease. The response from New Zealanders was not positive, with complaints including the filling not being as runny as the New Zealand version.

Varieties

Cadbury has introduced many variants to the original Creme Egg, including:
Border Creme Eggs, the first variant of Creme Egg to be produced, were wrapped in various colours of tartan foil and contained chocolate fondant. Introduced as "Fry's Border Creme Eggs" in 1970, they were rebranded as "Cadbury Border Creme Eggs" in 1974 and discontinued in 1981.
 Mini Creme Eggs (bite-sized Creme Eggs)
 Caramel Eggs (chocolate egg with a caramel filling), launched in 1994
 Caramilk Egg (Canadian market only)
 Mini Caramel Eggs (bite-sized Caramel Eggs)
 Chocolate Creme Eggs (chocolate fondant filling), introduced in 1999
 Orange Creme Eggs (Creme Eggs with a hint of orange flavour)
 'Berry' Creme Eggs (magenta wrapper and pink fondant, sold circa 1987 in Australia)
 Dairy Milk with Creme Egg bars
 Creme Egg Fondant in a narrow cardboard tube (limited edition)
 Creme Egg ice cream with a fondant sauce in milk chocolate
 Dream Eggs, a New Zealand-exclusive white chocolate egg with a white chocolate fondant filling; Dream Eggs were discontinued in 2010.
 Cadbury McFlurry (British, Irish, Canadian and Australian McDonald's only); a McFlurry soft serve mix with a Creme Egg & chocolate filling. In the UK, it is currently, but not always, released as part of McDonald's' Monopoly promotions.
 Creme Egg Twisted (Britain, Ireland, Australia and Canada) Available all year round. It was introduced to Australia in 2010, but was quickly discontinued.
 Holiday Ornament Creme Egg
 Mad About Chocolate Egg (Australia and New Zealand). Purple wrapper, milk chocolate with chocolate fudge filling. Discontinued in 2010.
 Creme Egg Pots Of Joy – melted Cadbury milk chocolate with a fondant layer
 Screme Egg Pots Of Joy – melted Cadbury milk chocolate but with a layer of Screme Egg fondant
 Creme Egg Layers Of Joy – A layered sharing dessert with Cadbury milk chocolate, chocolate mousse, chocolate chip cookie and fondant dessert with a creamy topping.
 Peppermint Egg (New Zealand). Discontinued in 2010.
 Giant Creme Eggs, a thick chocolate shell with white and caramel fondant filling. Manufactured in North America. Discontinued in 2006.
 Creme Egg Splats – fried egg shaped pieces of milk chocolate filled with fondant.
 Screme Egg – traditional milk chocolate shell with a white and green fondant center – available for Halloween
 Screme Egg Minis – Mini version of the Screme Egg – available for Halloween
 Fudgee-O Egg (Canada). Introduced at the start of 2015. Filled with a fudge creme centre.
 Oreo Cream Egg (Canada). Introduced in 2016. Filled with a white cream centre containing Oreo cookie crumbs.
 Ghost Egg – Same as normal Creme Egg, but without the "yolk".
 White Chocolate Creme Egg – Creme Egg, but with white chocolate replacing the milk chocolate. Released in 2018 as part of a UK promotion.
 Golden Creme Egg – Creme Egg, but with golden-coloured chocolate. Released in 2021 as part of the 50th Anniversary of the product under Cadbury's ownership.

Other products include:
 Jaffa Egg – Manufactured in New Zealand, Dark chocolate with orange filling
 Marble Egg – Manufactured in New Zealand, Dairy Milk and Dream Chocolate swirled together
 Caramilk Egg – Manufactured in New Zealand, a mixture of caramel and white chocolate with a creamy centre of the same flavour.
 Chips Ahoy! Egg – Manufactured in Canada, Introduced in 2017. Filled with a chocolate chip cookie dough centre.

Advertising

The Creme Egg has been marketed in the UK and Ireland with the question "How do you eat yours?" and in New Zealand with the slogan "Don't get caught with egg on your face". Australia and New Zealand have also used a variation of the UK question, using the slogan "How do you do it?"

In North America, Creme Eggs are advertised on television with a small white rabbit called the Cadbury Bunny (alluding to the Easter Bunny) which clucks like a chicken. Other animals dressed with bunny ears have also been used in the television ads, and in 2021, out of over 12,000 submissions in the Hershey Company's third annual tryouts, an Australian tree frog named Betty was named the newest Cadbury Bunny. Ads for caramel eggs use a larger gold-coloured rabbit which also clucks, and chocolate eggs use a large brown rabbit which clucks in a deep voice. The advertisements use the slogan "Nobunny knows Easter better than him", spoken by TV personality Mason Adams. The adverts have continued to air nearly unchanged into the high definition era and after Adams's death in 2005, though currently the ad image is slightly zoomed to fill the screen. The majority of rabbits used in the Cadbury commercials are Flemish Giants.

In the UK, around the year 2000, selected stores were provided standalone paperboard cutouts of something resembling a "love tester". The shopper would press a button in the centre and a "spinner" (a series of LED lights) would select at random a way of eating the Creme Egg, e.g. "with chips". These were withdrawn within a year. There are also the "Creme Egg Cars" which are, as the name suggest, ovular vehicles painted to look like Creme Eggs. They are driven to various places to advertise the eggs but are based mainly at the Cadbury factory in Bournville. Five "Creme Egg Cars" were built from Bedford Rascal chassis. The headlights are taken from a Citroën 2CV.

For the 2008/2009 season, advertising in the UK, Ireland, Australia, New Zealand and Canada consisted of stopmotion adverts in the "Here Today, Goo Tomorrow" campaign which comprised a Creme Egg stripping its wrapper off and then breaking its own shell, usually with household appliances and equipment, while making various 'goo' sounds, and a 'relieved' noise when finally able to break its shell. The Cadbury's Creme Egg website featured games where the player had to prevent the egg from finding a way to release its goo.

A similar advertising campaign in 2010 featured animated Creme Eggs destroying themselves in large numbers, such as gathering together at a cinema before bombarding into each other to release all of the eggs' goo, and another which featured eggs being destroyed by mouse traps.

In Halloween 2011, 2012 and 2013, advertising in Canada and New Zealand consisted of the "Screme Egg" Easter aliens, such as 48 seconds in the advertising.

Campaigns/slogans

 : "Shopkeeper" campaign in which a boy asks for 6000 Cadbury Creme Eggs.
 "Irresistibly" campaign showing characters prepared to do something unusual for a Creme Egg, similar to the "What would you do for a Klondike bar?" campaign. 
 Early 1980s: "Can't Resist Them." 
 1985: The "How Do You Eat Yours?" campaign. 
 Mid-1980s–present: "Nobunny Knows Easter Better than Cadbury" 
 1985–1996: "Don't get caught with egg on your face" 
 1990–1993: The first television campaign to use the "How Do You Eat Yours?" theme, featuring the zodiac signs. 
 1994–1996: Spitting Image characters continued "How Do You Eat Yours?" 
 1997–1999: Matt Lucas, with the catchphrase "I've seen the future, and it's egg shaped!"
 2000–2003: The "Pointing Finger" 
 2004: The "Roadshow" finger 
 2005: "Licky, Sticky, Happy" 
 2006–2007: "Eat It Your Way" 
 2008–2010: "Here Today, Goo Tomorrow" 
 2008–2009: "Unleash the Goo"  
 2009: "Release the Goo" 
 2010: "You’ll Miss Me When I’m Gone" 
 2011: "Goo Dares Wins" 
 2011: "Get Your Goo On!" 
 2012: "Gooing For Gold" 
 2012: "It's Goo Time" 
 2013–2016: "Have a fling with a Creme Egg" 
 2017–2019: "It's Hunting Season" 
 2020–2021: "Creme Egg Eatertainment" 
 2021: "Creme Egg Golden Goobilee" 
 2022-2023: "How do you NOT eat yours?”

Creme Egg Café 
In 2016, Cadbury opened a pop-up café titled "Crème de la Creme Egg Café" in London. Tickets for the café sold out within an hour of being published online. The café on Greek Street, Soho, was open every Friday, Saturday and Sunday from 22 January to 6 March 2016.

Creme Egg Camp 
In 2018, Cadbury opened a pop-up camp. The camp in Last Days of Shoreditch, Old Street was open every Thursday to Sunday from 19 January, to 18 February 2018

See also

References

External links

 
 Cadbury Chocolates from Hershey's website

British confectionery
Creme Egg
The Hershey Company brands
Mondelez International brands
Brand name chocolate
Products introduced in 1963
Candy